This is a timeline of Discovery, a network of television channels owned by Discovery Inc. that broadcast in the UK.

1980s and 1990s
1989
 1 April – Discovery Channel Europe launches. UK viewers could only receive the channel from Intelsat satellites at 27.5° West.
1990
 No events.
1991
 No events.
1992
 March – TLC launches.
1993
 22 July – Discovery, but not TLC, starts broadcasting on the Astra satellite.
 1 September – Discovery becomes a pay channel when they join the newly formed Sky Multichannels package. It broadcasts on the platform for eight hours each day, timesharing transponder space with CMT Europe.
1994
 TLC launches on Astra and timeshares with Discovery, broadcasting daily from 9am until 4pm. Discovery extends its broadcast hours by two hours and is now on air between 4pm and 2am.
1995
 No events.
1996
 No events.
1997
 April – TLC is relaunched as Discovery Home & Leisure.
 Animal Planet launches, broadcasting from midday until midnight.
1998
 1 October – The launch of Sky Digital sees the launch of new channels from Discovery - Discovery Civilisation, Discovery Sci-Trek, Discovery Travel & Adventure and Discovery Channel +1 - and the currently on air channels expand broadcasting hours and are now on air for 18 hours a day on digital platforms, beginning at 8am.
1999
 No events.

2000s
2000
 1 February – Discovery Wings and Discovery Kids launch. They are created for the OnDigital platform. Discovery Kids broadcasts during the day with Wings taking over for the evening and are initially exclusive to OnDigital.
 1 July – Discovery Health launches.
2001
 May – Animal Planet +1 and Discovery Home & Leisure +1 launch.
 18 November – Discovery Wings and Discovery Kids are replaced on ITV Digital by the Discovery Channel. Kids and Wings continue as full time channels on other platforms.
 The closure of Sky's analogue service sees Discovery ending its part-time analogue transmissions.
2002
 No events.
2003
 April – Discovery Science replaces Discovery Sci-Trek.
2004
 No events.
2005
 February – Discovery Travel & Living replaces Discovery Travel & Adventure.
 7 May – 
 Discovery Home & Health and Discovery Real Time replace Discovery Health and Discovery Home & Leisure respectively, the former expanding into a female-orientated lifestyle channel.
 Discovery Home & Health +1 launches.
 22 August – Discovery Real Time Extra launches.
2006
 22 May – Discovery HD launches.
2007
 1 March – Discovery Turbo replaces Discovery Wings and Discovery Kids.
 25 June – Discovery Channel +1.5 launches.
 November – Discovery Knowledge replaces Discovery Civilisation and the schedule expands to also cover  programming on engineering, crime and technology.
2008
 8 January – DMAX and DMAX +1 launches.
 21 April – 
 DMAX +2 launches.
 Discovery Science +1 replaces Discovery Channel +1.5.
 June – Discovery Knowledge +1 launches.
 August – DMAX +1.5 launches.
 November – Discovery Travel & Living +1 launches.
2009
 January – Investigation Discovery launches, replacing Discovery Travel & Living +1.
 20 March – Discovery Shed replaces Discovery Real Time Extra.
 30 September – QUEST launches. It is the first non-Discover-branded channel to launch in the UK and is established as a free-to-air showcase of programming from across the Discovery channel portfolio.
 November – 
DMAX +1.5 closes.
QUEST +1 launch.

2010s
2010
 15 October – QUEST begins broadcasting a 24-hour schedule on all platforms except Freeview.
 7 November – Discovery History and Discovery History +1 replace Discovery Knowledge and Discovery Knowledge +1.
2011
 30 June – QUEST begins broadcasting a 24-hour schedule on Freeview after Gems TV, with whom QUEST had shared apace, acquired a 24-hour Freeview stream.
2012
 No events.
2013
 30 April – TLC, TLC +1 and Investigation Discovery +1 launch, replacing Discovery Real Time, Discovery Real Time +1 and Discovery Travel & Living.
2014
 21 July –  Quest broadcasts sport for the first time when it shows live football in the form of the 2014 Schalke 04 Cup - a pre-season tournament.
2015
 No events.
2016
 No events.
2017
 15 March – Quest Red launches.
2018
 March – Following Discovery, Inc.'s purchase of Scripps Networks Interactive, Discovery adds three lifestyle channels to its portfolio - Food Network, HGTV and Travel Channel. The acquisition also sees Discovery taking a 50% stake in UKTV.
2019
 16 January – DMAX becomes a feee-to-air channel and launches on Freeview and Freesat.
 1 April – Discovery Inc. announces that it will acquire BBC Studios' stakes in Good Food, Home and Really, while BBC Studios will acquire Discovery's stakes in the seven remaining UKTV networks for £173 million.
 11 June – Discovery Inc. takes full control of the ex-UKTV channels, Good Food, Home and Really.
 12 September – The Food Network merges Good Food.

2020s
2020
 21 January – HGTV replaces Home.
 27 August – Travel Channel closes.
2021
 6 January – Discovery Shed and Discovery Home & Health close.

References 

 
Culture-related timelines
History of television
British history timelines
Television in the United Kingdom by year
United Kingdom television timelines